John Alexander Anderson (June 26, 1834 – May 18, 1892) was a six-term U.S. Representative from Kansas (1879–1891), and the second President of Kansas State Agricultural College (1873–1879).

Anderson was born in Washington County, Pennsylvania in 1834, and graduated from Miami University in Oxford, Ohio, in 1853. His father, William Caldwell Anderson, served as the fourth President of Miami University during this time, holding that position from 1849 to 1854. Future U.S. President Benjamin Harrison was his roommate for a time in college.

Church career and University Presidency 
Following graduation, John Anderson entered the Presbyterian ministry, and was ordained four years later. His first charge was located in San Francisco, where he served until 1862 when he was appointed chaplain of the 3rd California Volunteer Infantry. In this capacity, he accompanied General Patrick Edward Connor and the regiment on its expedition to Salt Lake City, Utah. Alexander resigned from this role in the spring of 1863, and he was subsequently appointed relief agent, United States Sanitary Commission, a post he held until 1867.

In 1868 Anderson came to Kansas as pastor of the First Presbyterian church in Junction City. He soon became a vocal critic of the fact that Kansas State Agricultural College, the Land-grant university in neighboring Manhattan, Kansas, was focusing on providing a classic liberal arts education rather than a practical agricultural education. Partly as a result of his advocacy, the Kansas Board of Regents appointed Anderson the second President of Kansas State on September 1, 1873. Anderson's tenure was marked by pedagogical reform in which academic emphasis was subordinated to a more practical approach to applied agriculture.

Political career 
Anderson was elected as a Republican to the U.S. House of Representatives in 1878, but he continued to serve as head of Kansas State until September, 1879, when he resigned. He was reelected to congress three times, before failing to receive the Republican nomination in 1886. Anderson promptly switched from the Republican party to running as an Independent Republican and won reelection anyway. In 1888 he was elected to his final term, again as a Republican.

After his Congressional career ended, President Benjamin Harrison, his former college roommate, appointed Anderson consul general to Cairo, Egypt in 1891. However, Anderson grew ill in the execution of his duties and died in Liverpool, England in 1892 while in transit back to the United States.

Legacy 
 Anderson Hall, the administrative building on the campus of Kansas State University, is named in his honor. The building, which was under construction during his tenure at Kansas State, is listed on the National Register of Historic Places.

References 

 Williard, Julius T. (1940) History of Kansas State College of Agriculture and Applied Science.

External links 
 Brief biography

Presidents of Kansas State University
Miami University alumni
Politicians from Manhattan, Kansas
United States Sanitary Commission people
1834 births
1892 deaths
Ambassadors of the United States to Egypt
19th-century American diplomats
Republican Party members of the United States House of Representatives from Kansas
19th-century American politicians